Pierre Pierlot (26 April 1921 – 9 January 2007) was a French oboist.

1921 births
2007 deaths
French classical oboists
Male oboists
Musicians from Paris
20th-century French musicians
20th-century French male musicians
20th-century classical musicians